Ronald Barry Evans AM (7 July 1939 – 9 March 2007) was an Australian rules footballer, Chairman of the Australian Football League (AFL) from 1998 to 2007, as well as President of the Essendon Football Club from 1988 to 1992.

Education
Evans was educated at Caulfield Grammar School in Melbourne, where he was a classmate of linguist Michael Clyne, businessman Ron Walker, and 1960 Brownlow Medal winner John Schultz.

He played full-forward in Caulfield Grammar's First XVIII, a team which also contained two other future VFL players: Ron Cabble who played with Hawthorn,  and Footscray's John Schultz.

Evans later gained both a BSc and an MBA.

Football career
Although not solidly built (he weighed 78 kg), he was 6'2" (188 cm), and his very long arms gave him extra inches in marking contests.

Recruited from Essendon Baptists in 1958 – he had broken the Essendon District Football League's Essendon goalkicking record in 1957 – he played his first senior match for Essendon, as a reserve, at the Melbourne Cricket Ground, against Melbourne on 10 May 1958.

Altogether, he played 64 games for Essendon from 1958 to 1962, mostly at full-forward, kicking 210 goals. He played his best football under coach Dick Reynolds.

He missed a number of games through injury in 1961; but, in 1962, John Coleman's second year as coach, he only played six senior games for Essendon, having lost his regular place at full-forward to Charlie Payne.

His brief senior record is impressive:
 1958: 10 games (2 as a reserve), 27 goals (including 7 goals in one match) — plus 1 night game, 1 goal.
 1959: 20 games, 78 goals (including 9 goals in a match on two occasions, and 6 goals in a match on another two occasions)
 1959: full-forward in losing Grand-Final team)1959 VFL season#Grand Final Teams
 1959: Victorian State Team
 1959: VFL Leading Goalkicker at 19 years, 78 goals (including 5 goals from only 6 touches in the 1959 First Semi-Final against Collingwood, and 2 goals in the losing GrandFinal against Melbourne)
 1960: 18 games, 67 goals (including 10 goals in a match on one occasion, 8 goals in a match on one occasion, and 6 goals in a match on another)
 1960: Victorian State Team
 1960: VFL Leading Goalkicker 67 goals (despite being the competition's leading goalkicker, Evans was held goal-less in Essendon's 1960 First Semi-Final loss to Collingwood)
 1961: 10 games (1 as a reserve), 21 goals  — plus 1 night game, 3 goals.
 1962: 6 games, 16 goals
 1962: Last game for Essendon (as a reserve) against St Kilda on 4 August 1962.

In 1963, he moved to Western Australia, got his form back, and played a total of 60 games at full-forward for the West Perth Football Club in the Western Australian National Football League (WANFL) over three seasons from 1963 to 1965.
 1963: 97 goals
 1963: WANFL Leading goalkicker.
 1964: 84 goals
 1964: West Perth's Leading goalkicker.
 1965: 90 goals
 1965: West Perth's Leading goalkicker.

He retired as a footballer at the end of the 1965 season at the age of 26.

Cricket career
He was a fine wicket-keeper whilst at Caulfield Grammar School; and, much to the distress of its headmaster, S. W. Kurrle, who wanted him to play for the school's First XI, Evans played his first District cricket match for North Melbourne Cricket Club whilst still at school, at 16 years of age.

When he returned to Melbourne after his sojourn in Western Australia, he resumed his cricketing career with North Melbourne, and went on to play a total of 126 games for the North Melbourne First XI.

He captained the First XI, and was made a life member of the club. His club record of five catches and three stumpings as a North Melbourne First XI wicketkeeper has never been surpassed.

Football administrator
He served on the committee of the Essendon Football Club from 1978 to 1987, having lost the 1981 election for president by a single vote to his former teammate Greg Sewell.

In 1988 he stood for president once again; and, despite Sewell being a hot favourite for the position, Evans won the election. He served as President of the Essendon Football Club from 1988 to 1992.

Evans unexpectedly announced his retirement as president of the Essendon F.C. at the end of 1992. As president he had been responsible for many significant events and changes, including engineering the 1992 move of Essendon's home matches to the Melbourne Cricket Ground and the 1991 retention of coach Kevin Sheedy when it seemed inevitable that Sheedy would move to New South Wales and coach the Sydney Swans.

Soon after his surprise resignation it was revealed that he had been appointed to one of the new positions of AFL commissioner whose task it was to guide, influence and direct the future of the AFL competition. He served as an AFL commissioner from 1993 to 1997 and from 1998 to 2007 he was the chairman of the AFL (i.e., the governing body of the premier Australian rules football competition).

Business interests
Evans also became a very successful businessman, working as an executive for Spotless, and later as the company's managing director from 1992 to 2004.

On 12 June 2006, in the Queen's Birthday Honours List, he was made a Member (AM) of the Order of Australia for service to business and Australian rules football.

Legacy
In 2006, the AFL announced that Evans was to have an abdominal tumor removed and that, due to his ill-health he was retiring. He died of abdominal cancer on 9 March 2007.

He was posthumously awarded membership in the administrator's Australian Football Hall of Fame in 2007.

The Ron Evans Medal was created in his name, awarded to the AFL Rising Star of that year, beginning in 2007, when it was inaugurally presented to Joel Selwood of the Geelong Football Club.

See also
 List of Caulfield Grammar School people

Footnotes

References
 Maplestone, M., Flying Higher: History of the Essendon Football Club 1872–1996, Essendon Football Club, (Melbourne), 1996. 
 Ross, J. (ed), 100 Years of Australian Football 1897–1996: The Complete Story of the AFL, All the Big Stories, All the Great Pictures, All the Champions, Every AFL Season Reported, Viking, (Ringwood), 1996.

External links
 
 
 Ronald Barry (Ron) Evans, at WAFL Footy Facts.
 Mick Davis, "Farewell for the man who changed AFL" (The Australian, 17 March 2007)
 Patrick Smith, "Dignified leader who always kicked straight and true", (The Australian, 10 March 2007)
 Channel Nine Sunday Programme Chat Transcript: John Lyons on the AFL
 Channel Nine Sunday Programme  Transcript: Behind the Rules

1939 births
2007 deaths
VFL/AFL administrators
People educated at Caulfield Grammar School
Australian chief executives
Coleman Medal winners
Essendon Football Club administrators
Essendon Football Club players
Members of the Order of Australia
Australian rules footballers from Melbourne
West Perth Football Club players
Deaths from cancer in Victoria (Australia)
Australian Football Hall of Fame inductees